The canton of Pont-Sainte-Maxence is an administrative division of the Oise department, northern France. Its borders were modified at the French canton reorganisation which came into effect in March 2015. Its seat is in Pont-Sainte-Maxence.

It consists of the following communes:
 
Les Ageux
Angicourt
Barbery
Bazicourt
Beaurepaire
Brasseuse
Brenouille
Cinqueux
Monceaux
Montépilloy
Pontpoint
Pont-Sainte-Maxence
Raray
Rhuis
Rieux
Roberval
Rully
Sacy-le-Grand
Sacy-le-Petit
Saint-Martin-Longueau
Villeneuve-sur-Verberie
Villers-Saint-Frambourg-Ognon

References

Cantons of Oise